Milton Jonas (December 14, 1926 – October 9, 2006) was an American politician who served in the New York State Assembly from 1966 to 1976.

References

1926 births
2006 deaths
Republican Party members of the New York State Assembly
20th-century American politicians